Sigrid Doris Peyerimhoff (born 12 January 1937, in Rottweil) is a theoretical chemist and Emeritus Professor at the Institute of Physical and Theoretical Chemistry, University of Bonn, Germany.

Education
After completing her abitur, Peyerimhoff studied physics at the University of Gießen, completing her degree in 1961 and receiving her doctorate under supervision of Bernhard Kockel in 1963. After researching at the University of Chicago, the University of Washington, and Princeton University, she returned to Germany and gained her habilitation at the University of Gießen in 1967. She became professor for theoretical chemistry at the University of Mainz in 1970, and at the University of Bonn in 1972.

Quantum chemistry 
Her contributions have been to the development of ab initio quantum chemical methods, in particular, multireference configuration interaction, and to their application in many fields of physics and chemistry. Particular emphasis has been given to electronically excited states, molecular spectra and photochemistry. Many studies are on atmospheric molecules and ions, their lifetimes in excited states and decomposition due to radiative and non-radiative processes, and on stability and spectra of clusters.

Some of her students became well known for their contribution to quantum chemistry, including Bernd Engels, Stefan Grimme, Bernd A. Hess, Christel Marian, Matthias Ernzerhoff and Bernd M. Nestmann.

Awards and honors
During her career, she received several awards and memberships:

 1977 Medal of the International Academy of Quantum Molecular Science 
 1988 Gottfried Wilhelm Leibniz-Prize 
 1994 Cross of Merit of the Federal Republic of Germany
 2007 Cothenius-Medaille of the Academy of Sciences Leopoldina
 2008 Grand Cross of Merit of the Federal Republic of Germany
 2011 Honorary doctor of the University of Ulm

She is also a member of the International Academy of Quantum Molecular Science

Publications
She is the author of over 400 original articles in various international journals and coauthor of Umweltstandards: Fakten und Bewertungsprobleme am Beispiel des Strahlenrisikos. Her history of computational chemistry in Germany is of particular note. She edited Interactions in Molecules.

Partial bibliography
 Peyerimhoff, Sigrid D. Interactions in Molecules: Electronic and Steric Effects. Weinheim: Wiley-VCH, 2003.

References

External links
Her International Academy of Quantum Molecular Science web page
University of Bonn web page

1937 births
Living people
20th-century German chemists
Theoretical chemists
Gottfried Wilhelm Leibniz Prize winners
Commanders Crosses of the Order of Merit of the Federal Republic of Germany
Members of the International Academy of Quantum Molecular Science
Academic staff of the University of Bonn
University of Giessen alumni
Academic staff of Johannes Gutenberg University Mainz
People from Rottweil (district)
German women chemists
Computational chemists
20th-century German women scientists
21st-century German chemists